Clinton Woolsey may refer to:

 Clinton F. Woolsey, United States Army aviator and flying instructor
 Clinton N. Woolsey, American neuroscientist